The Malta national badminton team represents Malta in international badminton team competitions. The national team is controlled by Badminton Malta, the governing body for Maltese badminton. The Maltese competed in the Sudirman Cup from 1991 to 1997. In the last edition, they finished in 52nd place.

Seven time national champion, Matthew Abela became the first Maltese badminton player to represent Malta at the Summer Olympics in Tokyo, Japan.

Participation in BWF competitions

Sudirman Cup

Participation in Helvetia Cup

Players 

Male players
Matthew Abela
Samuel Cassar
Mark Abela
Stefan Salomone
Samuel Cali`

Female players
Francesca Clark
Fiorella Sadowski
Sarah Fava
Yanika Polidano
Klara O'Berg

References

Badminton
National badminton teams
Badminton in Malta